Thomas Vettorel (born 17 September 2000) is an Italian professional footballer who plays as a goalkeeper for  club Monopoli on loan from Frosinone.

Club career 
On 1 February 2021 he signed with Frosinone.

On 22 July 2021, he joined Carrarese on loan. On 22 July 2022, Vettorel was loaned to Monopoli.

References

External links
 
 

2000 births
Living people
Footballers from Rome
Italian footballers
Association football goalkeepers
Serie C players
A.S. Cittadella players
Pro Sesto 2013 players
Savona F.B.C. players
Piacenza Calcio 1919 players
Frosinone Calcio players
Carrarese Calcio players
S.S. Monopoli 1966 players